Fred Graves (14 August 1924 – 11 February 2009) was a Canadian rower. He competed in the men's double sculls event at the 1948 Summer Olympics.

References

1924 births
2009 deaths
Canadian male rowers
Olympic rowers of Canada
Rowers at the 1948 Summer Olympics
Rowers from Ottawa